The Buddha of Suburbia may refer to:

 The Buddha of Suburbia (novel), a 1990 novel by Hanif Kureishi
 The Buddha of Suburbia (TV serial), a 1993 BBC television series based on the book
 The Buddha of Suburbia (soundtrack), a 1993 soundtrack album by David Bowie inspired by the above television series
 "The Buddha of Suburbia" (song), a single released from the soundtrack album